Liu Kang was a Singaporean artist known for his Balinese-themed figurative paintings. He was a founding member of the Singapore Art Society, and was credited with developing the Nanyang Style, an art style associated with the Nanyang Academy of Fine Arts.

Biography 
Liu was born in Fujian Province and he spent his early years in British Malaya, studied art in Shanghai and Paris, and taught art in Shanghai during the 1930s. Under the influence of Chinese artist and art teacher Liu Haisu (1896–1994), Liu admired, and often appropriated the styles of French-based modernist painters such as Cézanne, van Gogh and Matisse. Liu moved to Singapore in 1942 and had been credited with numerous contributions to the local arts scene. In 1952, Liu, Chen Chong Swee, Chen Wen Hsi and Cheong Soo Pieng went on a field trip to Bali in search of a visual expression that was Southeast Asian. In 1970, Liu was awarded the Bintang Bakti Masyarakat (Public Service Star) by the Singapore Government. He was honoured by the same agency in 1996 with the Pingat Jasa Gemilang (Meritorious Service Medal).

In May 2003, the 92-year-old artist gave the majority of his paintings and sketches, amounting to over 1,000 pieces, to the Singapore Art Museum. He also unveiled a painting of three Balinese women, each carrying a basket, titled Offerings.

To commemorate the 100th year of Liu's birth, the National Art Gallery, Singapore, together with the Global Chinese Arts & Culture Society and Lianhe Zaobao, held a forum titled "Liu Kang: Tropical Vanguard" on 2 April 2011. The forum brought together a panel of established artists and scholars to discuss Liu's significant influence and contributions to Singapore's art history.

Personal life 
Liu was married to Chen Jen Ping and had four sons, one daughter. One of his sons, Liu Thai Ker, is an architect, urban planner and was the chairman of the National Arts Council of Singapore.

Death 
Liu died on 1 June 2004 due to natural causes.

Bibliography 
W.W. Yeo, et al. (2011), Liu Kang: Colourful Modernist, National Gallery Singapore,

References

External links
 Tracing the Footsteps of a Master Painter
 

1911 births
2004 deaths
Painters from Fujian
Chinese emigrants to British Malaya
Singaporean artists
20th-century Singaporean painters
20th-century Chinese painters
Recipients of the Pingat Jasa Gemilang
Recipients of the Bintang Bakti Masyarakat